The 2006–2008 European Nations Cup (ENC) Third Division (a European rugby union competition for national teams)  will be contested over two years during which all teams meet each other home and away.  The Third Division consists of four levels, which effectively constitute the 5th through 8th levels of European international rugby.  The winner of each division shall be promoted to the next highest division, and the loser relegated to the next division lower.

The previous champion of Division 3A, Latvia was promoted to the Second Division and replaced with Serbia and Montenegro (now Serbia), which came last in Round 3 of the qualification for the World Cup 2007.

Division 3A

Matches:

Division 3B

Matches:

Division 3C

Bosnia was relegated to division 3D, while Israel will undertook a relegation/promotion playoff with Cyprus.

Matches:

Division 3D (2006–07)

Semifinals 

 Monaco was disqualified for irregular use of French players.

Final

 Greece promoted to 2008–10 Div. 3/C

Division 3D (2007–08)Matches''':

3C/3D Promotion/relegation play-off

See also
 2006-2008 European Nations Cup First Division
 2006-2008 European Nations Cup Second Division

2006–08
2006–07 in European rugby union
2007–08 in European rugby union
European Nations Cup Third Division
European Nations Cup Third Division
Euro 3